A Selection of Hymns for Public Worship is a hymn book compiled by William Gadsby, a minister of the Gospel Standard Strict Baptists in England. First published in the 19th century, it is still in current use.

History

William Gadsby, a Strict and Particular Baptist minister, first published his selection of hymns in 1814 in Manchester, printed at the printing works owned by his son John Gadsby. William Gadsby published a later edition in 1838. After his death a further enlarged edition was published including a second supplement selected by J C Philpot, another Strict Baptist Minister. It was written to counteract what Gadsby believed to be Arminian and legalistic tendencies in some of Isaac Watts' Psalms and Hymns.  Nevertheless Gadsby's Selection of Hymns does include many hymns by Isaac Watts.

Contents

This hymnal contains 1156 hymns (words only) by various authors.  These are primarily, but not exclusively, from the Calvinistic stream of Protestant thought.

Authors

The edition currently available includes the following authors, here listed by number of hymns used.
Joseph Hart (219); William Gadsby (173); Isaac Watts (145) John Berridge (72); John Newton (63) John Kent (51); Charles Wesley (41); Thomas Kelly (34); Samuel Medley (31); Anne Steele (27); Augustus M. Toplady (24); Richard Burnham (22); Henry Fowler (20); William Cowper (18); Joseph Swain (18); Daniel Herbert (12); Benjamin Beddome (10); John Fawcett (10); William Hammond (10); John Stevens (9); John Adams (9); Phillip Doddridge (8); John Cennick (6).

There are other authors with fewer hymns in this book, as well as eight anonymous contributions.

Examples of Gadsby's own writing

Gadsby's own hymns are of a high standard.  For example, number 667 is worthy of Watts and Charles Wesley, both highly regarded for their hymn writing abilities.

1 IMMORTAL honours rest on Jesus' head;
My God, my Portion, and my Living Bread;
In him I live, upon him cast my care;
He saves from death, destruction, and despair.

2 He is my Refuge in each deep distress;
The Lord my strength & glorious righteousness;
Through floods and flames he leads me safely on,
And daily makes his sovereign goodness known.

3 My every need he richly will supply;
Nor will his mercy ever let me die;
In him there dwells a treasure all divine,
And matchless grace has made that treasure mine.

4 O that my soul could love and praise him more,
His beauties trace, his majesty adore;
Live near his heart, upon his bosom lean;
Obey his voice, and all his will esteem.

The third line of the last verse certainly echoes the thought of Charles Wesley's hymn Thou Shepherd of Israel, and mine, with the line "Eternally held in Thy heart".

Another example from William Gadsby illustrates the Calvinistic flavour of this book.  Hymn number 530 describes election in Calvinistic language.

1 ELECTION is a truth divine,
As absolute as free;
Works ne'er can make the blessing mine;
 'Tis God's own wise decree.

5 Nor law, nor death, nor hell, nor sin,
Can alter his decree;
The elect eternal life shall win,
And all God's glory see.

Availability

The hymnal is currently available in these editions :  "Buckram" (standard pew edition), 936p., ; Large print version, 636p., ; Large print (leather), 936p.,; leather binding and India paper, 895 pp.; hardback, 895 pp.; and a Kivar edition, 473 pp.

The hymn book is used by the Gospel Standard Strict Baptists in England and the United States and a few Old School or Primitive Baptist churches in the United States. Many of the Strict Baptists use the Companion Tune Book, a musical score of 1011 hymn tunes designed as a companion to Gadsby's hymn book. The hymn book was never widely used in churches outside the United Kingdom, but there is some renewed interest in it among Reformed Baptists as devotional poetry.

Gadsby also published Nazarene's Songs, containing about 250 of his own hymns.

See also
List of English-language hymnals by denomination

References

External links
Gospel Standard Trust Publications
Gadsby's Hymns With Indexes

Selection of Hymns for Public Worship
1814 non-fiction books
1814 in Christianity
1814 in music
Baptist Christianity in England